William McOustra (1881–1953) was a Scottish professional footballer who played as an left half and inside right in the Football League for Manchester City. He also played in the Scottish League for Celtic and later served on the groundstaff at Celtic Park.

Personal life 
In September 1914, one month after the outbreak of the First World War, McOustra enlisted as a private in the Scots Guards. He arrived on the Western Front in March 1915 and was medically discharged from the army in September 1917, due to a gunshot wound to the right knee.

Career statistics

References 

1881 births
People from Larbert
Scottish footballers
Ashfield F.C. players
Scots Guards soldiers
Association football wing halves
English Football League players
Association football inside forwards
British Army personnel of World War I
Stenhousemuir F.C. players
1953 deaths
Manchester City F.C. players
Scottish Football League players
Abercorn F.C. players
Alloa Athletic F.C. players
Celtic F.C. non-playing staff
British shooting survivors